Mayavathi is a 1949 Indian Tamil-language film produced and directed by T. R. Sundaram. The film stars T. R. Mahalingam and Anjali Devi.

Plot 
The story is that of a princess falling in love with a prince who hates women. Another person, a barber is also interested in the princess. He uses several tricks to get her but fails every time. How the princess succeeds in winning over the prince forms the plot of the story.

Cast 
The list is adapted from a review article published in The Hindu newspaper.

Male cast
T. R. Mahalingam as Surangathan
S. V. Subbaiah
Kali N. Rathnam
M. G. Chakrapani
K. K. Perumal
M. E. Madhavan
A. Karunanidhi
Narayana Pillai

Female cast
Anjali Devi as Mayavathi
C. T. Rajakantham

Dance
Lalitha
Padmini

Production 
The story is based on a folk tale and the film was produced at Modern Theatres that was located on the outskirts of Salem. The dances by Lalitha and Padmini were choreographed by K. K. Sinha.

Soundtrack 
Music was composed by G. Ramanathan while the lyrics were penned by A. Maruthakasi and Ka. Mu. Sheriff. Singer is T. R. Mahalingam. Playback singer is M. L. Vasanthakumari.

Pennenum Maaya Peyaam Poi Maadharai is the first film song penned by A. Maruthakasi.

Reception 
According to Randor Guy, this movie was a flop s at the box-office. This was supported in M. Karunanidhi's autobiography. Karunanidhi had written that to recover from this flop in 1949, mogul T.R. Sundaram decided to make "Manthiri Kumari" movie in a grand style and succeeded well in 1950."Mayavathi", nevertheless is "remembered for: Lalitha-Padmini’s dances, and the daring romantic scenes between the lead pair."

References

External links 
 - First film song by A. Maruthakasi

Indian romance films
Films based on Indian folklore
Films scored by G. Ramanathan
1940s Tamil-language films
1940s romance films
Indian black-and-white films